Glassite may refer to:

 A transparent material akin to glass
 An alternative spelling of the Glasite religious movement